Live at the BBC is a compilation album by English folk-rock band Fairport Convention released in 2007. It includes tracks recorded for the BBC for various radio programmes between 1968 and 1974 and consists of four CDs in a fold-out package with a fifty-page booklet including song lyrics and numerous contemporary photographs.

Track listing

Disc one
 "Close the Door Lightly When You Go" (Eric Andersen) – 2:57
 "I Don't Know Where I Stand" (Joni Mitchell) – 3:36
 "Some Sweet Day" (Felice & Boudleaux Bryant) – 2:16
 "You Never Wanted Me" (Jackson C. Frank) – 3:15
 "Nottamun Town" (trad. arr. Fairport Convention) – 3:35
 "Marcie" (Joni Mitchell) – 3:34
 "Night in the City" (Joni Mitchell) – 3:05
 "Jack O'Diamonds" (Bob Dylan, Ben Carruthers) – 3:12
 "Gone, Gone, Gone" (Phil & Don Everly) – 1:59
 "Suzanne" (Leonard Cohen) – 5:25
 "If It Feels Good, You Know It Can't Be Wrong" (Richard Thompson & Ashley Hutchings) – 3:12
 "Eastern Rain" (Joni Mitchell) – 3:10
 "Fotheringay" (Sandy Denny) – 3:09
 "I Still Miss Someone" (Johnny Cash & Roy Cash) – 2:23
 "Bird on a Wire" (Leonard Cohen) – 3:27
 "Tried So Hard" (Gene Clark) – 2:54
 "Reno, Nevada" (Richard Fariña) – 2:23
 "Book Song" (Ian Matthews & Richard Thompson) – 3:05
 "Who Knows Where the Time Goes?" (Sandy Denny) – 4:14

Disc two
 "You're Gonna Need My Help" (Muddy Waters) – 3:56
 "Fotheringay" (Sandy Denny) – 2:59
 "Shattering Live Experience" (Simon Nicol) – 3:23
 "Cajun Woman" (Richard Thompson) – 2:44
 "Autopsy" (Sandy Denny) – 4:24
 "Si Tu Dois Partir" (Bob Dylan) – 2:25
 "Percy's Song" (Bob Dylan) – 5:25
 "Reynardine" (trad. arr. Fairport Convention) – 4:19
 "Tam Lin" (trad. arr. Dave Swarbrick) – 7:46
 "Sir Patrick Spens" (trad. arr. Fairport Convention) – 3:44
 "Medley: The Lark in the Morning/Rakish Paddy/Foxhunter's Jig/Toss the Feathers" (trad. arr. Fairport Convention) – 4:12
 "The Lady Is a Tramp" (Rodgers and Hart) – 2:11
 "Walk Awhile" (Dave Swarbrick, Richard Thompson) – 4:00
 "Poor Will and the Jolly Hangman" (Richard Thompson, Dave Swarbrick) – 5:33
 "Doctor of Physick" (Dave Swarbrick, Richard Thompson) – 3:37

Disc three
 "Sir Patrick Spens" (trad. arr. Fairport Convention) – 3:32
 "The Bonny Bunch of Roses" (trad. arr. Dave Swarbrick, Dave Mattacks, Simon Nicol, Richard Thompson) – 10:53
 "Dirty Linen" (trad. arr. Dave Swarbrick) – 4:15
 "Now Be Thankful" (Richard Thompson, Dave Swarbrick) – 2:24
 "The Journeyman's Grace" (Dave Swarbrick, Richard Thompson) – 3:56
 "Now Be Thankful" (Richard Thompson, Dave Swarbrick) – 3:23
 "Tokyo" (Jerry Donahue) – 2:37
 "Matthew, Mark, Luke and John" (Dave Mattacks, Simon Nicol, Dave Pegg, Dave Swarbrick, Richard Thompson) – 5:29
 "Possibly Parsons Green" (Trevor Lucas, Pete Roche) – 4:27
 "Rosie" (Dave Swarbrick) – 4:02
 "John the Gun" (Sandy Denny) – 5:03
 "Fiddlestix" (trad. arr. Dave Swarbrick, Dave Mattacks, Dave Pegg, Jerry Donahue, Trevor Lucas) – 2:47
 "Rising for the Moon" (Sandy Denny) – 4:16
 "Down in the Flood" (Bob Dylan) – 3:27

Disc four
 "Let's Get Together" (Chet Powers) – 2:48
 "One Sure Thing" (Harvey Brooks, Jim Glover) – 3:35
 "Lay Down Your Weary Tune" (Bob Dylan) – 3:37
 "Chelsea Morning" (Joni Mitchell) – 3:01
 "Violets of Dawn" (Eric Andersen) – 3:53
 "If (Stomp)" (Ian MacDonald, Richard Thompson) – 2:35
 "Time Will Show the Wiser" (Emitt Rhodes) – 2:59
 "If I Had a Ribbon Bow" (Hughie Prince, Louis Singer) – 2:34
 "Meet on the Ledge" (Richard Thompson) – 2:48
 "Light My Fire" (Jim Morrison, John Densmore, Robert Krieger, Ray Manzarek)  – 1:20
 "Flatback Caper" (trad. arr. Dave Swarbrick, Simon Nicol, Dave Pegg, Dave Mattacks, Richard Thompson) – 6:23
 "Open the Door, Richard" (Bob Dylan) – 3:04
 "The Deserter" (trad. arr. Fairport Convention) – 3:54
 "The Hangman's Reel" (trad. arr. Dave Swarbrick) – 3:23
 "Tam Lin" (trad. arr. Dave Swarbrick) – 8:03
 "Sir William Gower" (trad. arr. Fairport Convention) – 4:47
 "Banks of the Sweet Primroses" (trad. arr. Fairport Convention) – 4:09
 "Sickness and Diseases" (Dave Swarbrick, Richard Thompson) – 3:41
 "Bridge over the River Ash" (trad. arr. Dave Swarbrick, Dave Mattacks, Dave Pegg, Simon Nicol) – 2:09
 "Lord Marlborough" (trad. arr. Fairport Convention) – 3:21
 "Angel Delight" (Dave Mattacks, Simon Nicol, Dave Pegg, Dave Swarbrick) – 4:04

Personnel
Ashley Hutchings, bass [CD 1; CD 2 1–12; CD 4 1–10];
Martin Lamble, drums [CD 1; CD 2 1–7; CD 4 1–10];
Simon Nicol, guitar, vocals, backing vocals [CD 1; CD 2; CD 3 1–6; CD 4];
Richard Thompson, guitar, vocals [CD 1; CD 2; CD 3 1–6; CD 4];
Sandy Denny, vocals [CD 1; CD 2 1–10; CD 3 11–14];
Ian Matthews, vocals [CD 1; CD 2 1–3; CD 4 5–10];
Ric Grech, violin [CD 2 4–7];
Dave Mattacks, drums [CD 2 8–15; CD 3; CD 4 11–21];
Dave Swarbrick, violin, vocals [CD 2 8–15; CD 3; CD 4 11–21];
Dave Pegg, bass, fiddle, mandolin, backing vocals [CD 2 13–15; CD 3; CD 4 11–21];
Trevor Lucas, guitar, vocals [CD 3 7–14];
Jerry Donahue, guitar, vocals [CD 3 7–14];
Judy Dyble, vocals [CD 4 1–8]

References

Fairport Convention albums
2007 compilation albums
2007 live albums
Island Records compilation albums